Manuel Quinziato (born 30 October 1979 in Bolzano) is an Italian former road racing cyclist, who rode professionally between 2002 and 2017 for the , ,  and  squads.

Major results

1997
 3rd  Team pursuit, UCI Junior Track Cycling World Championships
2001
 1st  Time trial, UEC European Under-23 Road Championships
 1st Stage 1 Giro delle Regioni
 1st Stage 2 Grand Prix Guillaume Tell
2002
 4th Overall Tour of Belgium
2003
 2nd Time trial, National Road Championships
2004
 3rd Japan Cup
 8th Giro del Piemonte
 9th Overall Tour of Belgium
2005
 8th Classic Haribo
 9th Overall Tour of Qatar
 10th Trofeo Laigueglia
2006
 3rd Time trial, National Road Championships
 5th Overall Eneco Tour
1st Stage 2
 6th Overall Danmark Rundt
 9th Chrono des Nations
2007
 3rd Time trial, National Road Championships
 4th E3 Prijs Vlaanderen
 4th Grand Prix de Fourmies
2008
 1st Stage 1 (TTT) Vuelta a España
 2nd Overall Three Days of De Panne
 2nd Chrono des Nations
2009
 4th Overall Three Days of De Panne
 9th Paris–Roubaix
 9th Gent–Wevelgem
2010
 10th Overall Three Days of De Panne
2011
 8th Omloop Het Nieuwsblad
2012
 2nd  Team time trial, UCI Road World Championships
 9th Overall Tour of Belgium
2014
 1st  Team time trial, UCI Road World Championships
2015
 1st  Team time trial, UCI Road World Championships
 1st Stage 3 (TTT) Critérium du Dauphiné
 1st Stage 9 (TTT) Tour de France
 1st Stage 7 Eneco Tour
2016
 1st  Time trial, National Road Championships
 1st Stage 1 (TTT) Tirreno–Adriatico
 1st Stage 5 (TTT) Eneco Tour
 2nd  Team time trial, UCI Road World Championships
 4th Overall Tour of Qatar
2017
 1st Stage 1 (TTT) Tirreno–Adriatico
 3rd Time trial, National Road Championships

Grand Tour general classification results timeline

References

External links

 
 
 
 
 

1979 births
Living people
Sportspeople from Bolzano
Italian male cyclists
UCI Road World Champions (elite men)
Cyclists from Trentino-Alto Adige/Südtirol